Robert J. Evans was a state legislator in Texas. He was a Republican. He served two terms representing Grimes County from January 1879 to January 1883. His widow's home in Navasota was burned and everything in it destroyed in 1886. She was a teacher.

See also
African-American officeholders during and following the Reconstruction era

References

Year of birth missing
People from Grimes County, Texas